Simone Carretta (active 1536–1586) was an Italian painter, active in a Mannerist style.

Biography
There are few biographical details on his life. He was born in Modena. He appears to have been influenced by Fra Bartolomeo. He is said to have fled Modena for political reasons. He is known for three altarpieces:
Mystical Marriage of St Catherine (1538) for the church of Santi Michele e Caterina, Colognora di Valdiroggio, within Pescaglia
Enthroned Madonna and Child with Saints (1556) for the parish church of San Bartolomeo, Pescaglia
Madonna and Child with Saints Paul, Peter and Angel with Cymbal (1568) for the parish church of Trassilico in Garfagnana, within Gallicano

References

Year of birth unknown
Year of death unknown
16th-century Italian painters
Italian male painters
Mannerist painters
Painters from Modena